Humboldtia bourdillonii is a species of in the family Fabaceae. It is thought to be found only in India, and is threatened by habitat loss.

References

bourdillonii
Endemic flora of India (region)
Endangered flora of Asia
Taxonomy articles created by Polbot